Mirza Aziz Akbar Baig (Urdu: مرزا عزيز اكبر بیگ) was born on 6 November 1938 in Multan, Pakistan. He is a lawyer of the Supreme Court of Pakistan.
He is the cousin of Late Member of Provincial Assembly Khalil Ullah Labar, Malik from PPP in 1988 and father in law of two times UC Chairman and MPA candidate Shakeel Hussain Labar from PP-198 Multan.

Education

He graduated in 1960 from Government Emerson College Multan. In 1963, he got his law degree from Punjab University Law College, Lahore.

Professional career

Baig started practice as a pleader in December at Multan under the pupilage of civil lawyer, Malik Faiz Rasool Labar, Advocate. In January 1966, he was enrolled as Advocate in the High Court and later, Advocate in the Supreme Court of Pakistan. From 1972 until 1988, he was a part-time lecturer of University Gillani Law College, Multan, and from 1974 to 1999, he was senior legal adviser of the Municipal Corporation Multan. He was the first principal of the Multan Law College, and at present he is Dean of the Multan Law College.

Political career

In 1981, Baig was elected general secretary of the High Court Bar Association Multan. From 1984 until 1988, he was elected as member of the Punjab Bar Council. In 1988, he was elected President of the District Bar Association Multan. In 1992, he was elected unopposed as President of the High Court Bar Association Multan.

Baig was elected as member Pakistan Bar Council for a period of five years from 2006 to 2010. On 3 May 2007, he was elected as Vice-Chairman of the Pakistan Bar Council and ex-officio Chairman of the National Action Committee constituted for the lawyers movement. Since 2008, Baig has served as Chairman of the Legal Education Committee of the Pakistan Bar Council. He is a member of the Board of Governors of the Public Library of Langay Khan Bagh, which was established in 1886. In 1989, the District Bar Association Multan established a new block of lawyers chambers in recognition of his services towards the lawyers community in the District Courts, Multan, namely "Aziz Block".

Role in lawyers movement

The Pakistan Bar Council is the National Bar Association for Pakistan and the Supreme Court Bar Association of Pakistan, but is subordinate to the Pakistan Bar Council. On 9 March 2007, Chief Justice of Pakistan Iftikhar Muhammad Chaudhry was put under house arrest by President Pervaiz Musharraf. The Pakistan Bar Council started the lawyers movement from 10 March 2007. Baig led the Bar Association from March 2007 until May 2008 as Vice-Chairman of the Pakistan Bar Council. He participated in all lawyers' conventions throughout Pakistan. In his speech to the lawyers' convention in the Supreme Court Auditorium, he said that "the lawyers of Pakistan do not accept General Pervaiz Musharraf as President of Pakistan".

On 12 May 2007 he accompanied Justice Iftikhar Muhammad Chaudary, Chief Justice of Pakistan to Karachi, but the lawyers and Chief Justice were detained at Karachi Airport and deported from Karachi that evening. He was beaten by police in the procession he led to the doorstep of the Election Commissioner of Pakistan when General Pervaiz Musharraf was nominated as candidate for President of Pakistan. During his tenure as Vice-Chairman of the Pakistan Bar Council, the Chief Justice of Pakistan, Mr. Iftikhar Muhammad Chaudhary, was restored to his office as Chief Justice of Pakistan on 20 July 2007. That day, he addressed a press conference and thanked God for the restoration of the Chief Justice of Pakistan and also pledged that the lawyers will struggle for the restoration of democracy. On Saturday, 3 November 2007, General Pervaiz Musharraf imposed a state of emergency and 60 judges were sacked.

Mirza Aziz Akber Baig played an important role in the lawyers movement again. At Lahore in a press conference, he said that "All judges who took the Oath under PCO (Provisional Constitution Order) have committed contempt of the order passed on 3 November 2007 passed by 7 members of the Bench of the Supreme Court of Pakistan." He protested the detention of the Chief Justice of Pakistan, Iftikhar Muhammad Chaudhary, his family members and the other 10 Supreme Court judges. The detention was unconstitutional. He demanded the lifting of restrictions on media and the withdrawing of PEMRA (Pakistan Electronic Media Regulatory Authority) ordinance. Lawyers under his supervision protested blocking transmission of Geo, Ary and Aaj TV channels. He contested that blocking of transmission of the TV channels violates fundamental rights, specifically freedom of expression which violates the Constitution of Islamic Republic of Pakistan. The law does not allow the government to unilaterally ban transmission of broadcast media, depriving citizens of their rights of access to information. Participants at the convention inside and outside Karachi Hall of the Lahore High Court Bar Association kept the atmosphere warm by chanting slogans against President Pervaiz Musharraf and in favour of the deposed judges and the Bar leaders. As a result of the lawyers' movement for rule of law, the deposed judges and independence of judiciary have been reinstated, and the democracy the judges have been restored.

References

http://www.hcbamultan.com
http://pakistan.ahrchk.net/chiefjustice/index.php?ch_id=3
http://www.google.com.pk/search?hl=en&q=mirza+aziz+akbar+baig&meta=

Pakistani lawyers
1938 births
Living people
People from Multan
Punjab University Law College alumni
Government Emerson College alumni
Punjabi people
Vice Chairmen of the Pakistan Bar Council